In neuroanatomy, the mandibular nerve (V) is the largest of the three divisions of the trigeminal nerve, the fifth cranial nerve (CN V). Unlike the other divisions of the trigeminal nerve (ophthalmic nerve, maxillary nerve) which contain only afferent fibers, the mandibular nerve contains both afferent and efferent fibers. These nerve fibers innervate structures of the lower jaw and face, such as the tongue, lower lip, and chin. The mandibular nerve also innervates the muscles of mastication.

Structure
The large sensory root emerges from the lateral part of the trigeminal ganglion and exits the cranial cavity through the foramen ovale. Portio minor, the small motor root of the trigeminal nerve, passes under the trigeminal ganglion and through the foramen ovale to unite with the sensory root just outside the skull.

The mandibular nerve immediately passes between tensor veli palatini, which is medial, and lateral pterygoid, which is lateral, and gives off a meningeal branch (nervus spinosus) and the nerve to medial pterygoid from its medial side. The nerve then divides into a small anterior and large posterior trunk.

The anterior division gives off branches to three major muscles of mastication and a buccal branch which is sensory to the cheek. The posterior division gives off three main sensory branches, the auriculotemporal, lingual and inferior alveolar nerves and motor fibres to supply mylohyoid and the anterior belly of the digastric muscle.

Branches
The mandibular nerve gives off the following branches:
 From the main trunk of the nerve (before the division)
 muscular branches, which are efferent nerves for the medial pterygoid, tensor tympani, and tensor veli palatini muscles (motor)
 meningeal branch (a sensory nerve)
 From the anterior division
 masseteric nerve (motor)
 deep temporal nerves, anterior and posterior (motor)
 buccal nerve (a sensory nerve)
 lateral pterygoid nerve (motor)
 From the posterior division
 auriculotemporal nerve (a sensory nerve)
 lingual nerve (a sensory nerve)
 inferior alveolar nerve (which gives off a motor nerve and a sensory nerve) 
mental nerve (sensory branch) and the nerve to mylohyoid (motor branch)

Supplies
The mandibular nerve innervates:

Anterior Division:

(Motor Innervation - Muscles of mastication)
 Masseteric nerve
 Masseter
 Medial pterygoid nerve
 Medial Pterygoid
 Tensor Tympani
 Tensor Veli Palatini Nerve
 Tensor Veli Palatini
 nervous spinosus (sensory) from foramen spinosum 
 Lateral pterygoid nerve
 Lateral pterygoid
 Deep temporal nerve
 Temporalis

(Sensory Innervation)
 Buccal nerve
 Inside of the Cheek (buccal mucosa)

Posterior Division

Lingual Split
(Sensory Innervation - NOT Taste)
 Anterior 2/3 of Tongue (mucous membrane)

Inferior Alveolar Split
(Motor Innervation)
 Mylohyoid
 Digastric (Anterior Belly)

(Sensory Innervation)
 Teeth and Mucoperiosteum of mandibular teeth
 Chin and Lower Lip

Auriculotemporal Split
 Scalp (auricula / temporal region)

See also
 Ophthalmic nerve
 Maxillary nerve
 Marginal mandibular branch of facial nerve
 Alveolar nerve (Dental nerve)

Additional images

References

External links
 
 
 

 
Trigeminal nerve